Aleksandr Dmitrijev (born 18 February 1982) is an Estonian football coach and former professional footballer, currently playing in amateur level as a midfielder for Tallinna Cosmos.

Internationally, Dmitrijev made 106 appearances for the Estonia national team.

Club career

TJK
Dmitrijev came through the youth system at TJK and made his senior league debut in 1998.

TVMK
In 1999, Dmitrijev joined TVMK. He made his debut in the Meistriliiga on 30 June 1999, against Levadia.

Levadia
In 2001, Dmitrijev joined Levadia. He won his first Meistriliiga title in the 2004 season, and two more in 2006 and 2007. In March 2008, Dmitrijev was dropped from the squad and put on the transfer list after refusing to sign a contract extension.

Hønefoss
On 31 March 2008, Dmitrijev joined Norwegian club Hønefoss on loan until 31 July, with the option to make the move permanent. On 30 July, he signed for Hønefoss on a permanent deal. Hønefoss finished the 2009 Adeccoligaen as runners up and were promoted to the Tippeligaen.

Ural Yekaterinburg
On 7 February 2011, Dmitrijev signed a two-and-a-half-year contract with Russian Football National League club Ural Yekaterinburg.

Neman Grodno
In March 2012, Dmitrijev signed for Belarusian Premier League club Neman Grodno. He made his debut in the Belarusian Premier League on 31 March 2012, in 0–1 home loss to Minsk.

Gomel
On 10 August 2012, Dmitrijev signed a half-year contract with Belarusian Premier League club Gomel.

Return to Levadia
On 1 March 2013, Dmitrijev returned to his former club Levadia. He won two consecutive Meistriliiga titles in 2013 and 2014.

Infonet
On 26 February 2015, Dmitrijev signed a two-year contract with Meistriliiga club Infonet. He won his sixth Meistriliiga title in the 2016 season. On 6 December 2016, Dmitrijev signed a new contract that would extend his stay by two years to 2018.

Hønefoss (loan)
On 28 July 2017, Dmitrijev joined his former club Hønefoss on loan for the remainder of the season.

Flora
On 2 January 2018, Dmitrijev signed a one-year contract with Meistriliiga club Flora. He retired from football after the 2018 season.

International career

Dmitrijev made his senior international debut for Estonia on 18 February 2004, his 22nd birthday, in a friendly against Moldova. Estonia won 1–0. He soon became a defensive stalwart of the national team. Dmitrijev made his 100th appearance for Estonia on 31 August 2016, in a 1–1 home draw against Malta in a friendly.

Managerial career
On 28 December 2018, Tallinna Kalev announced that Dmitrijev would join the club as manager in January 2019.

Honours

Club
Levadia II
Estonian Cup: 2001–02

Levadia
Meistriliiga: 2004, 2006, 2007, 2013, 2014
Estonian Cup: 2003–04, 2004–05, 2006–07, 2013–14

FCI Tallinn
Meistriliiga: 2016
Estonian Cup: 2016–17
Estonian Supercup: 2017

See also
 List of men's footballers with 100 or more international caps

References

External links

1982 births
Living people
Footballers from Tallinn
Estonian footballers
Estonian people of Russian descent
Association football midfielders
Esiliiga players
Meistriliiga players
FC TVMK players
FCI Levadia U21 players
FCI Levadia Tallinn players
FCI Tallinn players
FC Flora players
Norwegian First Division players
Eliteserien players
Hønefoss BK players
FC Ural Yekaterinburg players
Belarusian Premier League players
FC Neman Grodno players
FC Gomel players
Tallinna JK Legion players
Estonia youth international footballers
Estonia under-21 international footballers
Estonia international footballers
FIFA Century Club
Estonian expatriate footballers
Estonian expatriate sportspeople in Norway
Expatriate footballers in Norway
Estonian expatriate sportspeople in Russia
Expatriate footballers in Russia
Estonian expatriate sportspeople in Belarus
Expatriate footballers in Belarus
Estonian football managers
JK Tallinna Kalev managers